The Langoliers is a horror miniseries consisting of two parts of 1½ hours each. It was directed and written by Tom Holland and based on the novella by Stephen King from the four-part anthology book Four Past Midnight. The series was produced by Mitchell Galin and David R. Kappes, for Laurel Entertainment, Inc. The miniseries originally aired May 14–15, 1995 on the ABC network.

Plot

During a red-eye flight of a Lockheed L-1011 from Los Angeles International Airport to Boston Logan International Airport, the plane flies through a strange light, and most of the passengers and flight crew disappear, leaving behind only personal artifacts. Only those passengers who were asleep remain, discovering the predicament when they wake. Pilot Brian Engle, deadheading on the flight, takes the controls; unable to contact any other airport, he lands the plane at Bangor International Airport because of its long runway and lighter traffic level.

In addition to Brian, the other passengers include: Nick Hopewell, a mysterious Englishman; Laurel Stevenson, a schoolteacher on vacation;  Don Gaffney, a tool and die worker on his way to meet his new granddaughter; Albert Kaussner, a violinist on his way to the Berklee College of Music; Bethany Sims, a girl whose estranged family is planning on sending her to a drug rehab;  Bob Jenkins, a mystery-novel author; Dinah Bellman, a blind girl on her way to Boston to undergo optic surgery; Rudy Warwick, a perpetually sleepy businessman with a ravenous appetite; and Craig Toomy, a mentally unstable business executive agitated over missing a meeting in Boston. Dinah, who has some telepathic ability, warns the others about Craig. When he was young Craig suffered from psychological abuse from his overbearing father, who instilled in him a fear of the "Langoliers", creatures that devour the lazy and irresponsible.

Upon arrival at Bangor the airport is deserted and without any power. The group soon discovers that everything seems dull and lifeless; they cannot light matches, sounds don't echo, and food is tasteless. Brian fears the jet fuel will fail to move the plane, while Dinah reports hearing a strange sound in the distance. Bob postulates they passed through an aurora borealis and entered a time rip, sending them a few minutes into the past and outside of the present time stream. Craig becomes more unstable and after finding a gun in an airport locker he takes Bethany hostage and demands they take off again. Albert subdues Craig and Nick ties him up after realizing the gun's bullets are affected by the strange environment, and thus harmless; a bullet bounces off Albert without hurting him.

Dinah warns the others that the noises in the distance are getting louder. Albert discovers that the "present time" is still on the plane, and objects brought from the airport regain their normal behavior once brought onboard. The group then determines they can indeed refuel, take off heading for the time rip, and hopefully return to normal time. As Brian prepares the plane for take off, the others go to bring Craig back, but find he has escaped his bonds. When found, he stabs Dinah and Don, killing the latter. Albert again subdues Craig, and the others leave him unconscious as they race back to the plane.

As they board, the group witnesses strange creatures consuming everything including the ground. Dinah (from conversation with Craig) calls these creatures Langoliers, which Bob deduces feed on time which has passed. As a panicked Craig runs out of the airport, a weak Dinah psychically convinces him that his meeting has moved from Boston to here. In a hallucinatory state, Craig gleefully admits to his boss that he cost his company $43 million, in hopes of escaping his father's abuse. The delay leaves Craig vulnerable and he is eaten by the Langoliers. The plane takes off just as the Langoliers consume the airport. As they fly through the void, Dinah dies while recalling to Laurel what she saw through her connection with Craig: "everything was beautiful, even the things that were dead."

As the plane approaches the time rip, Bob sees a snoozing Rudy and recalls they survived their first trip into the rift while asleep, and could disappear if they pass through it awake. Brian suggests reducing cabin pressure, which will knock them unconscious, but someone needs to remain awake to fly the plane and restore the pressure. Nick volunteers, having revealed that he was a government assassin on a mission, but tells Laurel to travel to London to explain this to his estranged father. Nick disappears as the plane enters the rift, and Brian wakes shortly after to land the plane in Los Angeles.

The passengers are concerned that they seem to be in a similar state as they were in Bangor, but Bob, noting the return of sound and smell, believes they may be a few minutes ahead of the Present, and that the present time stream will catch up to them. As they watch, they see other people blur into view before they rejoin the normal flow of time.

Cast
 Patricia Wettig as Laurel Stevenson, a school teacher who uncharacteristically answered a personal ad to meet a man in Boston.
 Dean Stockwell as Bob Jenkins, a mystery writer with a strong ability for deduction. He manages to piece together the situation and provides many outrageous theories which come true for the most part, sometimes with his sidekick Albert's help.
 David Morse as Captain Brian Engle, an airline pilot on his way to Boston after hearing his ex-wife had died in a fire. He is qualified to fly the plane and is able to take off and land it safely.
 Mark Lindsay Chapman as Nick Hopewell, a British secret agent and hitman going to Boston for a final mission. He is tough, quick, yet compassionate for the other passengers with the exception of Toomy.
 Frankie Faison as Don Gaffney, a military aircraft tool-and-die worker on his way to Boston to meet his first granddaughter.
 Baxter Harris as Rudy Warwick, a businessman whose insatiable appetite and sleepiness helps Bob deduce situations on more than one occasion.
 Kimber Riddle as Bethany Simms, a rebellious teenager on her way to Worcester, Massachusetts, to stay with her aunt, though she is convinced she'll be spending the entire time in drug rehab.
 Christopher Collet as Albert "Ace" Kaussner, a violinist on his way to attend a music school in Boston. He becomes the "Watson" to Bob Jenkins.
 Kate Maberly as Dinah Catherine Bellman, a blind girl on her way to Boston to have a surgery to help restore her eyesight. She has strange psychic powers and is able to see and communicate with Toomy telepathically. She is strong-willed and seems to know a lot more of what's going on than anyone else.
 Bronson Pinchot as Craig Toomy, a broker working for an unnamed large company, who is psychologically unsound due to abuse by his domineering father that he faced as a child.
 John Griesemer as Roger Toomy, Craig's cruel, bad-tempered father. Although he is supposedly deceased during the events of the miniseries, he continues to torment Craig in hallucinations.
 Stephen King in a cameo as Tom Holby, Craig Toomy's boss, to whom Toomy reveals, in his final hallucination, that he deliberately lost $43,000,000 by investing it in stocks that he knew were worthless.

Production
The miniseries was filmed almost entirely in and around the Bangor International Airport in Bangor, Maine (author King's hometown) during the summer of 1994. Producer David Kappes noted that the crew considered using an airport in Pittsburgh and a newly opened one in Denver, both of which were closed and therefore suitable for filming, but decided against them due to a desire to bring reality to the story and film in the airport where the series takes place. The film crew used a cold war-era bomber hangar, although final scenes were shot in a functional waiting area within the airport.

Real passengers were able to observe rehearsals although numerous close encounters between actors and tourists were reported. Due to jet noise from aircraft, a considerable budget was provided to re-record voices and over-loop in post-production.

Filming wrapped in September 1994, around two months after production began. The cost to produce the miniseries according to Charles Miller, production manner, was estimated in the region of $3 million to $5 million, although costs were kept lower due to the compact location of the airport and set. The cast and crew stayed in the Bangor Airport Marriot Hotel, filling 40 rooms.

Reception
 

Ken Tucker of Entertainment Weekly gave it a "B" rating, calling it an episode of The Twilight Zone stretched out to four hours, [but] nonetheless does have its moments. TV Guide gave it one out of five stars, calling it tedious and boring, criticizing its "dull" script, "cardboard characters", "ludicrous special effects", and its "dishwatery cast, [with the sole exception of] Pinchot, who rolls his eyes like an alien thespian from the Planet Ham". Variety found the first three hours of the series work well, but that it falls apart when the monster is revealed. The book Stephen King Films FAQ asserted that Bronson Pinchot "chews more scenery than all of the Langoliers put together".

The series did very well for ABC, finishing among the top 5 in the weekly ratings.

See also
 The Odyssey of Flight 33 (The Twilight Zone (1959))
 A Matter of Minutes (The Twilight Zone (1985))

References

External links
 
 

1995 American television series debuts
1995 American television series endings
1990s American television miniseries
Television shows based on works by Stephen King
American science fiction television films
Films about time travel
American time travel television series
Aviation television series
Films set in Maine
Films set in Los Angeles
Films set on airplanes
1990s psychological horror films
1990s science fiction horror films
1990s American time travel television series
Films directed by Tom Holland
Films about disability